The second season of Under the Dome, an American science fiction mystery drama television series, premiered on CBS on June 30, 2014, and ended on September 22, 2014.

Based on the novel of the same name written by Stephen King, Under the Dome tells the story of the residents of the fictional small town of Chester's Mill, when a massive, transparent, indestructible dome suddenly cuts them off from the rest of the world. Military forces, the government, and the media positioned outside the barrier attempt to break it down, while the residents trapped inside must find their own ways to survive with diminishing resources and rising tensions. A small group of people inside the dome must also unravel complicated mysteries in order to figure out what the dome is, where it came from, and when (and if) it will go away.

The second season has a score of 52/100, based on nine reviews, indicating "mixed or average reviews", on review aggregator website Metacritic. The season has a score of 57/100, based on 14 reviews, on film and TV review aggregator Rotten Tomatoes; the site's critical consensus for the season reads: "Though it reins in some of the first season's absurdity and shows potential for improvement, Under the Dome'''s second season still feels like a ride with no closure."

Like the first season, season two aired in the United States on Mondays at 10:00 pm ET, where it received an average of 1.6/5 in the 18–49 demographic and 7.17 million viewers over its 13-episode run.

 Season plot 
In the second season of Under the Dome, the people of Chester's Mill face new disasters on a daily basis. The town councilman, last season's de facto dictator, tries to keep the town under his control, but struggles to keep the trust of the people when someone disobeys his authority with better alternatives for surviving. A new girl mysteriously appears in the town, and her past holds major clues to the Dome's origins. The mysterious egg, which is considered the Dome's power source, is still somewhere in town, and it gradually gives more answers, so it must be protected. Somebody has found a way out of the Dome, and is taken to Zenith, another town close to Chester's Mill, where he uncovers that a private company has been researching the Dome, but with possibly nefarious motivations. As the townspeople face the ultimate threat to their lives, they must decide whether to follow the route out from the Dome, not knowing exactly what awaits them outside if they do.

 Cast and characters 
The cast members portray characters that were mostly taken from the original novel, "although some have been combined and others have changed jobs."

 Main 
 Mike Vogel as Dale 'Barbie' Barbara 
 Rachelle Lefevre as Julia Shumway 
 Natalie Martinez as Linda Esquivel
 Britt Robertson as Angie McAlister
 Alexander Koch as James 'Junior' Rennie 
 Eddie Cahill as Sam Verdreaux 
 Colin Ford as Joe McAlister 
 Nicholas Strong as Phil Bushey 
 Mackenzie Lintz as Norrie Calvert-Hill 
 Karla Crome as Rebecca Pine 
 Dean Norris as James 'Big Jim' Rennie 

Recurring
 Aisha Hinds as Carolyn Hill
 Jolene Purdy as Dodee Weaver
 Grace Victoria Cox as Melanie Cross
 John Elvis as Ben Drake
 Dale Raoul as Andrea Grinnell
 R. Keith Harris as Peter Shumway
 Megan Ketch as Harriet Arnold
 Sherry Stringfield as Pauline Rennie
 Dwight Yoakam as Lyle Chumley
 Estes Tarver as Tom Tilden
 Tia Hendricks as Audrey Everett
 Brett Cullen as Don Barbara
 Max Ehrich as Hunter May
 Mike Whaley as Malick

 Production 
On July 29, 2013, Under the Dome was renewed for a 13-episode second season, with executive producer and Under the Dome novel writer Stephen King announced to be writing the second-season premiere episode.

Brian K. Vaughan exited the series before the premiere of season two, citing personal reasons. However, he had helped plan the second season with Neal Baer and King before he left.

Stephen King made a cameo appearance in the season premiere, as a customer in the Sweetbriar Rose diner.

 Episodes 

 Reception 
 Critical reception 
The second season has a score of 52/100, based on nine reviews, indicating "mixed or average reviews", on review aggregator website Metacritic. The season has a score of 57/100, based on 14 reviews, on film and TV review aggregator Rotten Tomatoes; the site's critical consensus for the season reads: "Though it reins in some of the first season's absurdity and shows potential for improvement, Under the Dome's second season still feels like a ride with no closure."

Negative reviews included Hank Stuever of The Washington Post, who wrote that "I just don’t buy Under the Dome, on any level. I think the story is a shambles and the concept is dumb", and Verne Gay of Newsday, who wrote "Under the dumb". However, other critics were more positive; Mark Dawidziak of The Plain Dealer wrote that "If not top-tier TV terror fare, Under the Dome certainly is solid second-level stuff. And given the state of horror on television these days, that's a bloody good compliment. Even while acknowledging the occasional misstep, give Under the Dome credit for getting a lot of things right", while Sarah Rodman of The Boston Globe'' wrote that "there are glimmers of hope for season two".

Ratings

References

External links 
 Under the Dome Season 2 Episode List on Internet Movie Database
 Under the Dome on CBS on The Futon Critic

2014 American television seasons
Season 2